Wang Ou (born 28 October 1982), also known as Angel Wang, is a Chinese actress and model. She is known for playing Wang Manchun in Disguiser and Qin Banruo in Nirvana in Fire.

Career
In 2003, Wang won the Most Photogenic Award from the CCTV Modeling Competition. She made her acting debut in the television series The Ultimate Triangle Line (2005) and gained attention as the leading actress in the film Prequel of the Dart Hero (2010).

She is best known for her roles in the historical television series Nirvana in Fire (2015) and the spy war drama The Disguiser (2015), which won her Huading Awards for Best Supporting Actress. She then starred in the family drama Full Love alongside Hawick Lau.

In 2017, she was cast in the historical epic The Rise of Phoenixes which co-stars Chen Kun and Ni Ni.

In 2018, she starred in the fantasy wuxia drama The Legend of Jade Sword as the female lead.

In 2019, Wang starred in the period drama Memories of Peking, and business romance drama Pushing Hands. She also featured in the fantasy epic drama Novoland: Eagle Flag as one of the major supporting characters. The same year she starred alongside Zhang Ruoyun in the spy drama Awakening of Insects.

Filmography

Film

Television series

Variety show

Awards and nominations

References 

1982 births
Living people
Chinese television actresses
Chinese film actresses
Chinese female models
21st-century Chinese actresses
Actresses from Guangxi
People from Nanning